Isaris is a village and a community in the municipality of Megalopoli, Arcadia, Greece. It is situated in the mountains west of the Alfeios valley, at about 750 m elevation. It is considered a traditional settlement. It is 2 km east of Vastas, 5 km northwest of Chranoi and 11 km southwest of Megalopoli. Its population in 2011 was 86 for the village, and 140 for the community, which includes the small villages Petrovouni and Chrousa.

Population

See also
List of settlements in Arcadia
List of traditional settlements of Greece

References

External links
History and information about Isaris
 Isaris on GTP Travel Pages

Megalopolis, Greece
Populated places in Arcadia, Peloponnese